Georgia took part in the Junior Eurovision Song Contest 2019, which was held on 24 November 2019 in Gliwice, Poland.

Background

In the 2018 contest, Tamar Edilashvili represented her country in Minsk, Belarus with the song "Your Voice".She ended 8th out of 20 entries with 144 points.

Before Junior Eurovision

Ranina
Georgia used an original children's talent show format, Ranina (Georgian: რანინა), as the selection method for their artist. Starting on 24 March 2019, the show lasted around two months with ten candidate artists.

Contestants

Shows

Round 1 (24–31 March 2019)

Round 2 (7–14 April 2019)

Round 3 (21–28 April 2019)

Round 4 (5–12 May 2019)

Semi-final (19 May 2019)

Final (26 May 2019)
The winner of the final was Giorgi Rostiashvili, who would go on to represent Georgia with the song "We Want to Love".

At Junior Eurovision
During the opening ceremony and the running order draw which both took place on 18 November 2019, Georgia was drawn to perform sixth on 24 November 2019, following Spain and preceding Belarus.

Voting

Detailed voting results

Notes

References

Junior Eurovision Song Contest
2019
Georgia